Running Red is a 1999 American film, starring Jeff Speakman and Angie Everhart. It was directed by Jerry P. Jacobs.

Plot
A former member of an elite Soviet military team is ordered to kill three men or his family will be exterminated.

Cast
 Jeff Speakman as Greg / Gregori
 Angie Everhart as Katherine
 Stanley Kamel as Alexi
 Elya Baskin as Strelkin
 Cassie Ray as Amanda
 Bart Braverman as Mercier
 Geoffrey Rivas as Diaz
 DeLane Matthews as Stephanie
 Robert Miano as Chambers 
 Christopher Boyer as Gorch
 Lisa Arturo as Fawn
 Noah Blake as Sergei
 Jacob Chambers as Griff
 Pete Koch as Dominic
 Lincoln Simonds as Nikolai
 Peter Kwong as Cheung
 Tim Sitarz as "Stick"

Reception
TV Guide said, "High-speed chases, death-by-locomotive and multiple slayings dot the landscape of this derivative but high-octane thriller that delivers plenty of kickboxing and explosive mayhem. But the acting is wooden (even by action-movie standards) and there are way too many screaming confrontations between the leads."

References

External links
 
 
 Running Red at All Movie

1999 films
2000s English-language films
1990s English-language films
American action films
1990s American films
2000s American films